The Tulare Valley Railroad  was operational from December 22, 1992 after acquiring several former Santa Fe Railway branch lines in California's San Joaquin Valley on October 20, 1992.  The company was formed by Morris Kulmer & Kern Schumucher (of A&K Railroad Materials) and Michael Van Wagenen of Kyle Railways.  A&K Railroad Materials specializes in dismantling railroad lines and selling relay (used) track materials.  Kyle Railways operates several shortline railroads throughout the United States.

The TVRR operated  of track from December 1992 to May 1998.  The track consisted of the following routes:

Magunden to Arvin,  (Arvin Subdivision) 
Oil Jct. to Maltha,  (Oil City Subdivision) 
Ducor to Cutler,  (Porterville Subdivision) 
Corcoran to Calwa,  (Corcoran to Tulare abandon) 
Wyeth to Orange Cove and Minkler,  (Visalia Subdivision)
Hammond to Cameo, 

The TVRR later abandoned the following tracks:
Corcoran to Tulare
Visalia to Cutler 
Wyeth to Orange Cove, 
Orange Cove to Minkler

In May 1998, most of the remaining track was sold to the San Joaquin Valley Railroad.

References

Defunct California railroads
Spin-offs of the Atchison, Topeka and Santa Fe Railway
Transportation in Kings County, California
Transportation in Tulare County, California
Non-operating common carrier freight railroads in the United States
Companies based in Tulare County, California
Corcoran, California
History of the San Joaquin Valley